Draba longisiliqua, the long-podded whitlow grass, is a species of flowering plant in the family Brassicaceae, native to the Caucasus. Despite its common name, it does not resemble, nor is it related to, the true grasses. It is usually grown in an alpine house or scree bed, as it requires excellent drainage and protection from winter wet. The plant is also known to thrive in tufa. It has gained the Royal Horticultural Society's Award of Garden Merit.

References

longisiliqua